Tomer Hemed (born 2 May 1987) is an Israeli professional footballer who plays as a forward for Israeli Premier League club Hapoel Be'er Sheva and the Israel national team.

Early and personal life
Hemed was born and raised in Kiryat Tiv'on, Israel, to an Israeli-born father whose family is of Sephardi Jewish and Mizrahi Jewish (Syrian-Jewish) descent, and to a Polish-born mother whose family is of Ashkenazi Jewish descent. As a result, Hemed also holds a Polish passport, which eased his move to European leagues. He is the youngest of four brothers. Hemed is observant, and in September 2018, he was a substitute for Queens Park Rangers in an evening game against Millwall, so that he could abstain from eating or exercising until the end of the 24-hour period of the Jewish high holy day of Yom Kippur. After breaking his fast, he came on late into the game.

In 2013, he married Israeli model Shunit Faragi, who was crowned second place at Miss Israel 2008, and also represented their homeland in Miss Universe 2008. They have three daughters together.

Club career

Maccabi Haifa
Hemed was called up to Maccabi Haifa's first-team in early 2006, after scoring regularly for the under-18 side. He appeared three times with the main squad, scoring once, before returning to the youth side. He made his debut in the campaign on 3 March 2007, coming on as a substitute in a 1–2 home loss against Bnei Yehuda Tel Aviv. Hemed scored his first professional goals on 26 May, netting his side's both goals in a 2–0 win at Maccabi Herzliya. In 2007, he travelled with the Under-21 side to that year's Torneo di Viareggio; he scored once as Haifa was knocked-out in the group stage.

Hemed was subsequently loaned to Maccabi Herzliya, Bnei Yehuda Tel Aviv and Maccabi Ahi Nazareth (the latter being managed by John Gregory). Nazareth, however, finished last as Hemed scored nine goals.

Hemed returned to Maccabi Haifa in the 2010 summer, and appeared in 45 matches during the 2010–11 campaign, also scoring 18 goals as the club was crowned champions.

Mallorca
On 21 June 2011, Hemed signed a three-year deal with Spanish La Liga club RCD Mallorca. He made his debut in the main Spanish football league on 28 August, starting and being booked in a 1–0 home success against RCD Espanyol.

Hemed scored his first goals abroad on 1 October, scoring both his side's goals in a 2–2 draw at CA Osasuna. He also netted twice in his Copa del Rey debut, a 6–1 home routing over Real Sociedad on 10 January of the following year.

Hemed finished his first season abroad with nine goals, although four of them were from the penalty spot. In his second season he scored 11 goals, with the Balearic Islands outfit being relegated, however. In May 2013 Hemed suffered an Achilles tendon rupture, which kept him sidelined for seven months.

Almería
On 2 July 2014 Hemed returned to the Spanish top level, by agreeing to a two-year deal with UD Almería. After struggling to score in his first matches, he netted his first goal with the Andalusians on 4 October, the last in a 2–2 home draw against Elche CF.

In January 2015, Hemed scored two braces against Málaga CF (2–1 away win) and Valencia CF (2–3 away loss), taking his tally up to six. He finished the campaign with eight goals, being the club's top goalscorer, but suffered team relegation.

Brighton & Hove Albion
On 24 June 2015 Hemed signed a three-year deal with English Championship club Brighton & Hove Albion for an undisclosed fee. He scored his first goal for the Seagulls from the penalty spot in the last moments of an away game at Fulham, to seal a 2–1 victory. Hemed scored just one goal between September 2015 and February 2016, which drew criticism from supporters, but rediscovered his early season form to finish as the club's top scorer with 17 goals.

Tomer Hemed scored 13 goals in all competitions in Brighton's promotion-winning 2016–17 season, trading starting positions regularly with top-scorer Glenn Murray and Sam Baldock in a strike force that managed to score 44 league goals between them. Highlights from Hemed throughout the season included a last gasp equaliser in a 3–3 draw away to Brentford, the only goal in a hard earned 1–0 win against Cardiff City, and a late penalty in a narrow 1–0 away win against Burton Albion.

On 9 September 2017, Hemed scored his first Premier League goal for Brighton in a 3–1 victory over West Bromwich Albion. Hemed scored again in Brighton's next home Premier League game, a 1–0 win against Newcastle United on 24 September. Three days later, the FA announced that Hemed had been given a three-match ban for a stamp on the calf of Newcastle defender DeAndre Yedlin, an incident which went unnoticed by referee Andre Marriner.

On 16 November 2017, Hemed signed a contract extension with Brighton, keeping him on the south coast until the summer of 2019.

Queens Park Rangers (loan)
On 23 August 2018, Hemed joined Championship side Queens Park Rangers on a season-long loan. Two days later he scored his first goal for the club on his debut against Wigan Athletic in a 1–0 win at Loftus Road.

Charlton Athletic
On 19 August 2019, Hemed joined Championship side Charlton Athletic on a one-year contract after being released at Brighton. He made his debut for The Addicks as a substitute in a 1–0 home victory over fellow London side, Brentford on 24 August. Hemed was released by the South London side at the end of his contract following the clubs relegation after making 19 appearances in all competitions without finding the net.

Wellington Phoenix
On 30 November 2020, Hemed signed a one-year contract as a marquee player for A-League club Wellington Phoenix. He scored his first goal in his eighth game on 15 March 2021.

On 17 May 2021, Hemed drew media attention after he draped himself in an Israeli flag and donned a Jewish kippah during a 2–2 draw with Melbourne City FC. He received a yellow card for covering the face or head with a mask or other covering. This development coincided with the 2021 Israel-Palestine crisis. Phoenix general manager Dome claimed that Hemed was praying for peace and expressing solidarity with his country.

On 10 July, 2021. Wellington Phoenix announced that Tomer Hemed had departed the club.

Western Sydney Wanderers
On 11 July, 2021. The Western Sydney Wanderers announced Hemed signed a one-year deal with the club.

International career
Hemed appeared with the under-17, under-18, under-19 and under-21s, featuring regularly with the youth squads. In January 2011, he was called up to the senior Israel national team for a behind closed doors friendly against FC Dynamo Kyiv. Hemed made his unofficial debut on the 26th, scoring in a 3–2 win.

In May 2011, Hemed was called up to train with the national team for a friendly against Latvia in June. On 4 June, he made his international debut, starting and assisting Yossi Benayoun in a 2–1 victory.

Hemed scored his first international goal on 6 September, but in a 1–3 loss against Croatia. He also scored a hat-trick in a 6–0 routing against Luxembourg on 12 October of the following year.

Career statistics

Club

International

Scores and results list Israel's goal tally first, score column indicates score after each Hemed goal.

Honours
Maccabi Haifa 
Israeli Premier League: 2010–11

Brighton & Hove Albion 
EFL Championship runner-up: 2016–17

Hapoel Be'er Sheva
Israel Super Cup: 2022

Individual
Israel Footballer of the Year: 2017–18

See also
List of Jewish footballers
List of Jews in sports
List of Israelis

References

External links
 
 
 

1987 births
Living people
People from Kiryat Tiv'on
Israeli footballers
Jewish footballers
Association football forwards
Maccabi Haifa F.C. players
Maccabi Herzliya F.C. players
Bnei Yehuda Tel Aviv F.C. players
Maccabi Ahi Nazareth F.C. players
RCD Mallorca players
UD Almería players
Brighton & Hove Albion F.C. players
Queens Park Rangers F.C. players
Charlton Athletic F.C. players
Wellington Phoenix FC players
Western Sydney Wanderers FC players
Hapoel Be'er Sheva F.C. players
Israeli Premier League players
La Liga players
Segunda División players
Premier League players
English Football League players
Israel international footballers
Israel under-21 international footballers
Israel youth international footballers
Israeli expatriate footballers
Expatriate footballers in Spain
Expatriate footballers in England
Expatriate soccer players in Australia
Expatriate association footballers in New Zealand
Israeli expatriate sportspeople in Spain
Israeli expatriate sportspeople in England
Israeli expatriate sportspeople in Australia
Marquee players (A-League Men)
Israeli people of Polish-Jewish descent
Israeli people of Syrian-Jewish descent
Israeli Ashkenazi Jews
Israeli Sephardi Jews
Israeli Mizrahi Jews